San Cristóbal Municipality is the one of the 29 municipalities of the state of Táchira in Venezuela. The city of San Cristóbal is the shiretown of the San Cristóbal Municipality, which is also the state capital.

References

Municipalities of Táchira